The Mirpur District is one of the 10 districts of Pakistan's dependent territory of  Azad Kashmir. The Mirpur District is bounded on the north by the Kotli District, on the east by the Bhimber District, on the south by the Gujrat District of Pakistan's Punjab Province, on the south-west by the Jhelum District of Pakistan's Punjab Province, and on the west by Rawalpindi District of Pakistan's Punjab Province. The district is named after its main city, Mirpur. The district is mainly mountainous with some plains. The Mirpur  District has a humid subtropical climate which closely resembles that of the Gujrat District and the Jhelum District, the adjoining districts of Pakistan's Punjab Province.

History

During the British Raj, the Mirpur District was one of the five districts of the Jammu Province in the princely state of Jammu and Kashmir.  According to the 1941 census, the it had a population of 386,655, roughly 80% of whom were Muslim and 16% of whom were Hindu. It consisted of three tehsils:  the Bhimber Tehsil, the Kotli Tehsil, and the Mirpur Tehsil. The Bhimber Tehsil and the Kotli Tehsil were subsequently elevated to district status. The three districts presently constitute the Mirpur Division of Azad Kashmir. Small portions of the former Mirpur District were included in the Rajouri District of Indian-administered Jammu and Kashmir.

The original Mirpur District, along with the Poonch District and the Rajouri District, had close geographic, ethnic, and cultural ties with the West Punjab area, more so than with the city of Jammu and the rest of the Jammu Province. Due to those reasons, scholar Christopher Snedden stated that the people of Mirpur area had a strong desire to join Pakistan during the partition.

In November 1947, the Mirpur District was the site of the Mirpur Massacre, where many Hindus, Sikhs, and refugees from the partition, were killed by armed Pakistani tribesmen and soldiers.

Language and ethnicity
The main language, native to an estimated 85% of the district's population, is known under a number of sometimes ambiguous names. Its speakers call it variously Pahari, Mirpur Pahari, Mirpuri, and Pothwari, while some label it as Punjabi. Sociolinguists have regarded it as one of the three major dialects of the Pahari-Pothwari language complex, which is intermediate between Lahnda and Punjabi. Mirpur Pahari is mutually intelligible with the other two major dialects – Pothwari of the Potohar Plateau in the Punjab Province and the Pahari spoken to the north in Azad Kashmir and around Murree – and shares with them between 77% and 84% of its basic vocabulary, although the difference with the northernmost varieties (in Muzaffarabad) is sufficient to impede understanding. Mirpuri speakers have a strong sense of Kashmiri identity that takes precedence over linguistic identification with closely related groups outside of Azad Kashmir, such as the Punjabis of the Pothohar.

The Gujari language is spoken by an estimated 10% of the population. The local dialect is closely related to the Gujari varieties spoken in the rest of Azad Kashmir and in the Hazara region. Other languages spoken include Urdu and English.

Government

The district is administratively subdivided into two tehsils:

Dadyal Tehsil
Mirpur Tehsil

Villages
Notable villages in the district include:
Dadyal Tehsil

Amb
Balathi
Chattroh
Haveli Baghal
Kathar Dilawar Khan
Mandi
Mohra Malkan
Mohra Sher Shah
Rajoa
Ratta
Sahalia
Sarthala
Siakh Pahaith
Thalarajwali Khan
Thub Jagir

Mirpur Tehsil

Abdulahpur 
Abdupur
Arah Jagir
Banni
Chabrian Dattan
Chak Haryam
Chakswari
Chandral
Chatan
Chechian
Chitterpari
Dalyala
Dheri Thothal
Ghaseetpur Awan
Ghaseetpur Sohalian
Islamgarh
Jangian Kotla
Jatlan
Kakra
Kalyal Bhainsi
Kas Kalyal
Khari Sharif
Khokhar
Mehmunpur
Nagial
Pakhral
Potha Bainsi
Sahang

Notes

References

Bibliography

 
Districts of Azad Kashmir